Kleiner Feigling is a brand of naturally-flavoured fig liquor, made by BEHN in Eckernförde, Germany. The production of Kleiner Feigling started in 1992 and since then has reached annual worldwide sales of 1,000,000+ cases. The name translates literally to Little Coward and is a pun on the words feige (cowardly) and Feige (fig), which are homophones in German.

In Germany, the drink is often purchased in 20 milliliter shooter-sized bottles. Custom dictates that the drinker tap the cap of the upside down bottle on the table, making bubbles in the liquid just before it is consumed.

References

External links

http://www.kleinerfeigling.com
http://www.kleinerfeigling.de

Alcoholic drink companies
German distilled drinks
Fig dishes
German brands
Products introduced in 1992